Kargat (Qaraqat) is a town and the administrative center of Kargatsky District in Novosibirsk Oblast, Russia, located on the river Kargat. Population:    12,600 (1979); 12,700 (1959).

Administrative and municipal status
Within the framework of administrative divisions, Kargat serves as the administrative center of Kargatsky District. As an administrative division, it is, together with two rural localities, incorporated within Kargatsky District as the Town of Kargat. As a municipal division, the Town of Kargat is incorporated within Kargatsky Municipal District as Kargat Urban Settlement.

References

Notes

Sources

External links

Official website of Kargat 
Kargat Business Directory  

Cities and towns in Novosibirsk Oblast
Tomsk Governorate
